Dongsung-dong is a dong, neighbourhood of Jongno-gu in Seoul, South Korea. It is a legal dong (beopjeong-dong 법정동 ) administered under its administrative dong (haengjeong-dong 행정동 ), Ihwa-dong.

Notable places
 The Korean Culture & Arts Foundation (Hanguk Munhwa Yesul Jinheungwon 한국문화예술진흥원)
 Korea National Open University (Hanguk Bangsong Tongsin Daehakkyo 한국방송통신대학교)
 Marronnier Park
 National Institute for International Education Development, Ministry of Education (Gukje Gyoyuk Jinheungwon 국제교육진흥원)
 Dongsoong Art Center

See also 
Administrative divisions of South Korea

References

External links
 Jongno-gu Official site in English
 Jongno-gu Official site
 Status quo of Jongno-gu by administrative dong 
 Ihwa-dong Resident office 
 Origin of Dongsung-dong name

Neighbourhoods of Jongno-gu